Gold heptafluoride is a gold(V) compound with the empirical formula AuF7. The synthesis of this compound was first reported in 1986. However, current calculations suggest that the structure of the synthesized molecule was actually a difluorine ligand on a gold pentafluoride core, AuF5·F2. That would make it the first difluorine complex and the first compound containing a fluorine atom with an oxidation state of zero. The gold(V)–difluorine complex is calculated to be 205 kJ/mol more stable than gold(VII) fluoride. The vibrational frequency at 734 cm−1 is the hallmark of the end-on coordinated difluorine molecule.

References

Fluorides
Metal halides
Gold–halogen compounds
Substances discovered in the 1980s